Ian Ross (born 13 January 1986 in Sheffield) is an English footballer who plays for Belper Town.

Playing career

Sheffield United
Ross started his career as a trainee with Sheffield United. His "Blades" career was limited to just two League Cup games, the first of which was against Boston United in which he scored the winning goal. He had loan spells with Boston United and Bury during the 2005–06 season. Whilst at Boston he was named League Two's Player of the Month for October.

In July 2006, he joined Notts County on a six-month loan deal, which saw him play 31 games and scored one goal. After returning to Bramall Lane in January, the two clubs agreed a new loan deal until the end of the season.

Rotherham United
On 7 November 2007, he signed a loan deal at League Two side Rotherham United, he then joined permanently until the end of the season in January. Ross was released after his short-team deal at the Millers expired, along with five other players.

Non-League
Ross signed for Gainsborough Trinity, after a trial period in which he scored in the last minute 2–1 win over Chesterfield on 19 July 2008. On 20 March 2009, Ross was signed by Alfreton Town manager Nicky Law.

On 16 May 2011, Ross signed for Harrogate Town. He rejoined Boston United in November 2011, signing new contracts with the club in 2012 and 2013. He began the 2014–15 season with Belper Town.

Career statistics

References

External links

1986 births
Living people
Footballers from Sheffield
English footballers
Association football midfielders
Sheffield United F.C. players
Boston United F.C. players
Bury F.C. players
Notts County F.C. players
Rotherham United F.C. players
Gainsborough Trinity F.C. players
Alfreton Town F.C. players
Harrogate Town A.F.C. players
Belper Town F.C. players
English Football League players
National League (English football) players